Fury of the Jungle is a 1933 American adventure film directed by Roy William Neill and starring Donald Cook, Peggy Shannon and Alan Dinehart. It was co-written by Dore Schary from a story by Horace McCoy.

Plot
A love triangle story set in Malango, a remote jungle village in South America harboring a diverse assortment of European expats and criminal types, controlled by the cruel Taggart (Alan Dinehart). The heroine, Joan Leesom (Peggy Shannon), arrives on a river steamer with her brother, Arthur, in search of a lost city. Arthur has contracted a febrile illness and they are forced to disembark in the village, staying in the hut of "Lucky" Allen (Donald Cook), an escaped convict and former Marine who seemingly cannot abide women. Taggart, wanting to possess Joan, sees that the local doctor, Parrish (Dudley Digges), fails to help Arthur in time to save his life, leaving Joan alone with Lucky, with whom she falls in love. Lucky, feeling sympathy for Joan, endeavors to secure his passage with her out of the village by heading into the bush to collect animal pelts. Meanwhile, Taggart duels a convicted murderer, Frenchy, over Joan, killing him. On Lucky's return, Taggart attempts to frame him for the theft of a wallet. Parrish intervenes and is thrown to the crocodiles. Finally, Chita (Toshia Mori), a local woman ill-used by Taggart, reveals to her people the extent of Taggart's machinations, with the result that the villagers ensure that he receives Parrish's fate. Joan and Lucky then are able to escape from Malango and marry.

Cast
Donald Cook as "Lucky" Allen
Peggy Shannon as Joan
Dudley Digges as 'Doc' Parrish
Alan Dinehart as Taggart
Harold Huber as Gaston Labelle aka Frenchy
Toshia Mori as Chita
Frederik Vogeding as Captain Peterson (as Fredrik Vogeding)
Clarence Muse as Sunrise
Charles Stevens as Kimba

References

External links
Fury of the Jungle at TCMDB
Fury of the Jungle at IMDb

1933 drama films
1933 films
American black-and-white films
Films directed by Roy William Neill
American adventure films
1933 adventure films
Columbia Pictures films
1930s English-language films
1930s American films